Giuseppe Mingione (born 28 August 1972) is an Italian mathematician who is active in the fields of partial differential equations and calculus of variations.

Scientific activity
Mingione received his Ph.D. in mathematics from the University of Naples Federico II in 1999 having Nicola Fusco as advisor; he is professor of mathematics at the University of Parma. He has mainly worked on regularity aspects of the Calculus of Variations, solving a few longstanding questions about the Hausdorff dimension of the singular sets of minimisers of vectorial integral functionals and the boundary singularities of solutions to nonlinear elliptic systems. This connects to the work of authors as Almgren, De Giorgi, Morrey, Giusti, who proved theorems asserting regularity of solutions outside a singular set (i.e. a closed subset of null measure) both in geometric measure theory and for variational systems of partial differential equations. These are indeed called partial regularity results and one of the main issues is to establish whether the dimension of the singular set is strictly less than the ambient dimension. This question has found a positive answer for general integral functionals, thanks to the work of Kristensen and Mingione, who have also given explicit estimates for the dimension of the singular sets of minimisers. Subsequently, Mingione has worked on nonlinear potential theory obtaining potential estimates for solutions to nonlinear elliptic and parabolic equations. Such estimates allow to give a unified approach to the regularity theory of quasilinear, degenerate equations and relate to and upgrade previous work of Kilpeläinen, Malý, Trudinger, Wang.

Recognition
Mingione was awarded the Bartolozzi prize in 2005, the Stampacchia medal in 2006 and the Caccioppoli prize in 2010. In 2007 he was awarded an ERC grant. Mingione is listed as an ISI highly cited researcher and was invited to deliver the  Nachdiplom Lectures in 2015 at ETH Zürich. He was invited speaker at the 2016 European Congress of Mathematics in Berlin. In 2017 he was appointed Commander of the Order of Merit of the Italian Republic by the President of the Italian Republic.

References

External links
Website
Site of Caccioppoli Prize 
Site of European Research Council

1972 births
Living people
21st-century Italian mathematicians
PDE theorists
Functional analysts
Academic staff of the University of Parma
People from Caserta
Variational analysts
Mathematical analysts
European Research Council grantees
University of Naples Federico II alumni